Apoderus is a genus of leaf-rolling beetles belonging to the family Attelabidae subfamily Attelabinae.

Selected species
 Apoderus coryli (Linnaeus, 1758) - Hazel Leaf-roller Weevil 
 Apoderus erythropterus (Zschach, 1788)

References

External links
Biolib
Fauna Europaea